The Wisconsin River is a tributary of the Mississippi River in the U.S. state of Wisconsin. At approximately 430 miles (692 km) long. It is the state's longest river from north to south, being a part of The Mississippi River. The river's name was first recorded in 1673 by Jacques Marquette as "Meskousing", is rooted in the Algonquian languages used by the area's Native American tribes. The river's original meaning is obscure, but French explorers who followed in the wake of Marquette later modified the name to "Ouisconsin", and so it appears on Guillaume de L'Isle's map (Paris, 1718). This was simplified to "Wisconsin" in the early 19th century, before being applied to Wisconsin Territory and finally the state of Wisconsin.

The Wisconsin River originates in the forests of the North Woods Lake District of northern Wisconsin, in Lac Vieux Desert near the border of the Upper Peninsula of Michigan. It flows south across the glacial plain of central Wisconsin, passing through Wausau, Stevens Point, and Wisconsin Rapids. In southern Wisconsin, it encounters the terminal moraine formed during the last ice age, where it forms the Dells of the Wisconsin River. North of Madison at Portage, the river turns to the west, flowing through Wisconsin's hilly Western Upland and joining the Mississippi approximately 3 miles (4.8 km) south of Prairie du Chien.

The highest waterfall on the river is Grandfather Falls in Lincoln County. It creates the borders between Adams, Juneau, Columbia, Sauk, Dane, Iowa, Richland, Grant, and Crawford Counties, creating the only natural county borders within the state (excluding the Mississippi River and the Great Lakes).

Geology
The modern Wisconsin River was formed in several stages. The lower, westward-flowing portion of the river is located in the unglaciated Driftless Area, and this section of the river's course likely predates the rest by several million years. The lower reach of the river is narrower than its upstream valley, leading to the suggestion that the upper portions of the ancestor of the river flowed east before the Pleistocene. The remaining length of the river was formed gradually as glaciers advanced and retreated over Wisconsin. The stretch of river from Stevens Point north to Merrill was a drainage route for meltwater flowing away from the glaciers which covered northern Wisconsin during the Wisconsin Glaciation. As the glaciers retreated further northward, the river also grew in that direction. South from Stevens Point, the meltwater would have flowed into Glacial Lake Wisconsin, a prehistoric proglacial lake that existed in the central part of the state. As temperatures warmed around 15,000 years ago, the ice dam holding the lake in place burst, unleashing a catastrophic flood that carved the Dells of the Wisconsin River and joined the upper stretches of the river with the pre-existing lower river valley that today flows from Portage to Prairie du Chien.

History

In 1673, French missionary Jacques Marquette and French-Canadian explorer Louis Joliet, with their crew of five Metis arrived near the headwaters of Fox River. From there, they were told to portage their two canoes in a distance of slightly less than two miles through marsh and oak plains to the Wisconsin River.

The first documented exploration of the Wisconsin River by Europeans took place in 1673, when Jacques Marquette and Louis Jolliet of France canoed from Lake Michigan up the Fox River until they reached the present-day site of Portage in early June. At this location, the Wisconsin and Fox rivers are only 2 miles (3.2 km) apart, so the explorers could portage from the Fox to the Wisconsin River. They then continued downstream 200 miles (320 km) to the Wisconsin's mouth, entering the Mississippi on June 17. Other explorers and traders would follow the same route, and for the next 150 years the Wisconsin and Fox rivers, collectively known as the Fox-Wisconsin Waterway, formed a major transportation route between the Great Lakes and the Mississippi River.

Industry began to form on the Wisconsin in the early 19th century, as loggers started using the river to raft logs downstream from northern forests to sawmills in new cities like Wausau. By the 1880s, logging companies were damming the river to ensure the river had enough capacity for the logs being floated downstream. Later, at the start of the 20th century, more dams were constructed to provide for flood control and hydroelectricity. The dams also spurred tourism, creating reservoirs such as Lake Wisconsin that are popular areas for recreational boating and fishing. Today, the Wisconsin River is the hardest working river in the nation. There are 25 operating hydroelectric power plants on the Wisconsin River. The power plants harness 645 feet of the river's falls to generate nearly one billion kilowatt-hours of renewable electricity a year — enough energy to supply the residential needs of over 300,000 people without creating any pollution.

Despite this, a 93-mile (150 km) stretch of the Wisconsin between its mouth and the Prairie du Sac Dam is free of any dams or barriers and is relatively free-flowing. In the late 1980s, this portion of the river was designated as a state riverway, and development alongside the river has been limited to preserve its scenic integrity.

Navigable river of the United States
The Wisconsin River is a "navigable river of the United States."  This designation primarily means that the federal government has jurisdiction for dams on the river.  Dams that include hydropower facilities are regulated by the Federal Energy Regulatory Commission.  Courts have ruled that despite the fact that the river lies entirely in one state, it nevertheless historically carried goods to markets in other states and therefore is subject to the commerce clause of the United States Constitution.  Courts have also ruled that raw logs, even if merely carried via log drives to mills within the state, constitute commerce.  On the basis of these judgments, the Wisconsin River is considered a navigable waterway throughout its entire length.  This designation does not generally have bearing on recreational use of the river.  Boat registrations and fishing licenses are obtained through the Wisconsin Department of Natural Resources, for example.

Lower Wisconsin River State Riverway
The Lower Wisconsin River State Riverway is a state-funded project designed to protect the southern portion of the Wisconsin River. In 2020 the riverway was designated as a protected Ramsar site.

There are no dams or man-made obstructions to the natural flow of water between the hydroelectric dam just north of Sauk City and the confluence of the Wisconsin and the Mississippi. This long stretch of free-flowing river provides important natural habitats for a variety of wildlife, including white-tail deer, North American river otters, beavers, turtles, sandhill cranes, eagles, hawks, and a variety of fish species.

Recreational opportunities on the lower Wisconsin River range from fishing and canoeing to tubing and camping. Canoe camping is particularly popular because of the abundance of suitable sandbars along the riverway and because no permits are required.  On summer weekends, naturists can be found on Mazo Beach which is north of the village of Mazomanie. According to the Wisconsin Department of Natural Resources, two thirds of river users can be found on the stretch between Prairie du Sac and Spring Green.

Cities and villages along the river

Biron
Boscobel
Brokaw
Eagle River
Kronenwetter
Merrill
Merrimac
Mosinee
Muscoda
Nekoosa
Okee
Plover
Port Edwards
Portage
Prairie du Sac
Rhinelander
Rothschild
Sauk City
Schofield
Spring Green
Stevens Point
Tomahawk
Wausau
Whiting
Wisconsin Dells
Wisconsin Rapids

See also
List of Wisconsin rivers

References

External links

 River Alliance of Wisconsin
 Report on the Wisconsin River by Mark Morgan 
 Wisconsin's Name: Where It Came From and What It Means , Wisconsin Historical Society
 Lower Wisconsin State Riverway Board
 Pictures and Information of the Northern Stretch of the Wisconsin River
 Current Wisconsin River Conditions
 Lower Wisconsin River Maps and Mileage
 
 Kent, Paul G. and Dudiak, Tamara A. Wisconsin Water Law: A Guide to Water rights and Regulations, Second Edition (University of Wisconsin Extension, 2001).

Rivers of Wisconsin
Tributaries of the Mississippi River
Driftless Area
Bodies of water of Wood County, Wisconsin
Rivers of Grant County, Wisconsin
Rivers of Lincoln County, Wisconsin
Rivers of Sauk County, Wisconsin
Rivers of Columbia County, Wisconsin
Bodies of water of Portage County, Wisconsin
Rivers of Oneida County, Wisconsin
Rivers of Marathon County, Wisconsin
Mississippi River watershed
Ramsar sites in the United States